Böhmer, Boehmer or Bohmer is a German surname. Notable people with the surname include:

 Ben Böhmer, German DJ and composer
 Brenda Bohmer (born 1957), Canadian curler
 Christian Boehmer Anfinsen, biochemist and a 1972 Nobel Prize winner
 Edward Boehmer (1861–1940), American-born, London-based architect.
 Georg Rudolf Boehmer, (1723-1803), German botanist
 Irmgard Brendenal-Böhmer, German rower
 Hans-Joachim Böhmer (1940–1999), German double scull rower
 Harald von Boehmer, German immunologist
 Hasso von Boehmer, (1904-1945), German colonel who participated in the 20 July Plot against Hitler
 Henning von Boehmer, (born 1943), German author, publisher, lawyer and journalist 
 Johann Friedrich Böhmer, German historian
 Justus Henning Boehmer, German ecclesiastical jurist
 Konrad Boehmer, Dutch composer and writer
 Maria Böhmer, German politician
 Philipp Adolf Böhmer (1711–1789), German physician 
 Wolfgang Böhmer, (born 1936), German politician (CDU)

See also 
 Böhmer integral in mathematics
 Böhm
 Boehm
 Böhme (disambiguation)
 Boehner

German-language surnames